A Zip firelighter (or "zip cube") is a packaged small block of solid fuel containing kerosene, sold as a firelighter in Ireland, Canada and the United States, also in the UK, France & Belgium where they are the leading brand.

Zip also manufacture a "Clean Wrap", "Fast & Clean" or "Wrapped" product- the kerosene is encapsulated within a lightable plastic wrapper which keeps hands clean and rooms odour free.

Zip has diversified into Natural firelighters- made of compressed wood fibre and wax, and in the UK and Ireland Zip also supply convenience Firelogs and the pre-assembled "Fire In A Bag" along with a range of BBQ products.

Notes

External links
http://www.zipfires.com

Firelighting materials